Holographic Universe is the third full-length studio album by Swedish metal band Scar Symmetry. It is the last album to feature vocalist Christian Älvestam, who parted ways with the band shortly after the album's completion. It was released on 20 June 2008 in Europe, and on July 7, 2008 in North America. The album peaked on the charts at 37 in Finland, and 65 in Austria. A music video for the song "Morphogenesis" premiered on 18 September. The album is rumoured to be loosely based on Michael Talbot's book The Holographic Universe.

Upon its release, the science-themed Holographic Universe was considered Scar Symmetry's most commercially focused album, with critics drawing comparisons with progressive bands including Dream Theater. Allmusic comments that the band "appears more serious than ever about contrasting super melodic choruses, guitar harmonies, and even intermittent synths, against aesthetic evil twins like furious death metal growls, aggressive riffing, and torrential drumming". Blabbermouth.net claims the album does not dramatically expand on previous releases, but is a "well-planned and structured album that comes across as accessible and heavy at the same time".

"The Three Dimensional Shadow" was the first Scar Symmetry song to feature the use of an 8 string guitar.

Holographic Universe is also the only album where all the members of the band shared equal credit on writing and composition.

A thirteenth track, "Disintegrate the Hourglass", was written and recorded for the album, but was not included on the album.

Track listing
All music and lyrics by Scar Symmetry

Credits
Scar Symmetry
Christian Älvestam − vocals
Jonas Kjellgren − guitar
Per Nilsson − guitar
Kenneth Seil − bass guitar
Henrik Ohlsson − drums

Release history

See also
Holographic principle

References

2008 albums
Scar Symmetry albums
Nuclear Blast albums